The Adygea constituency (No. 1) is a Russian legislative constituency covering the entirety of the Republic of Adygea.

Members elected

Election results

1993

|-
! colspan=2 style="background-color:#E9E9E9;text-align:left;vertical-align:top;" |Candidate
! style="background-color:#E9E9E9;text-align:left;vertical-align:top;" |Party
! style="background-color:#E9E9E9;text-align:right;" |Votes
! style="background-color:#E9E9E9;text-align:right;" |%
|-
|style="background-color: " |
|align=left|Valentin Lednev
|align=left|Independent
|46,755
|23.90%
|-
| colspan="5" style="background-color:#E9E9E9;"|
|- style="font-weight:bold"
| colspan="3" style="text-align:left;" | Total
| 195,625
| 100%
|-
| colspan="5" style="background-color:#E9E9E9;"|
|- style="font-weight:bold"
| colspan="4" |Source:
|
|}

1995

|-
! colspan=2 style="background-color:#E9E9E9;text-align:left;vertical-align:top;" |Candidate
! style="background-color:#E9E9E9;text-align:left;vertical-align:top;" |Party
! style="background-color:#E9E9E9;text-align:right;" |Votes
! style="background-color:#E9E9E9;text-align:right;" |%
|-
|style="background-color: " |
|align=left|Grigory Senin
|align=left|Communist Party
|56,353
|26.16%
|-
|style="background-color: " |
|align=left|Anatoly Osokin
|align=left|Independent
|21,472
|9.97%
|-
|style="background-color: " |
|align=left|Valentin Lednev (incumbent)
|align=left|Independent
|21,252
|9.87%
|-
|style="background-color:"|
|align=left|Lybov Usacheva
|align=left|Our Home – Russia
|17,150
|7.96%
|-
|style="background-color:#D50000"|
|align=left|Aslan Khagurov
|align=left|Communists and Working Russia - for the Soviet Union
|17,041
|7.91%
|-
|style="background-color: " |
|align=left|Anatoly Berezovoy
|align=left|Independent
|14,505
|6.73%
|-
|style="background-color: " |
|align=left|Aleksey Aleynikov
|align=left|Liberal Democratic Party
|12,403
|5.76%
|-
|style="background-color: " |
|align=left|Zhanpago Apazhikhova
|align=left|Independent
|9,001
|4.18%
|-
|style="background-color:"|
|align=left|Aydamir Yeshev
|align=left|Yabloko
|6,837
|3.17%
|-
|style="background-color:#FE4801"|
|align=left|Aramby Blyagoz
|align=left|Pamfilova–Gurov–Lysenko
|4,788
|2.22%
|-
|style="background-color: " |
|align=left|Yuri Yakhutl'
|align=left|Independent
|4,618
|2.14%
|-
|style="background-color:"|
|align=left|Valery Tretyakov
|align=left|Agrarian Party of Russia
|4,588
|2.13%
|-
|style="background-color: " |
|align=left|Vitaly Kalashaov
|align=left|Independent
|4,349
|2.02%
|-
|style="background-color:#000000"|
|colspan=2 |against all
|14,159
|6.57%
|-
| colspan="5" style="background-color:#E9E9E9;"|
|- style="font-weight:bold"
| colspan="3" style="text-align:left;" | Total
| 215,393
| 100%
|-
| colspan="5" style="background-color:#E9E9E9;"|
|- style="font-weight:bold"
| colspan="4" |Source:
|
|}

1999

|-
! colspan=2 style="background-color:#E9E9E9;text-align:left;vertical-align:top;" |Candidate
! style="background-color:#E9E9E9;text-align:left;vertical-align:top;" |Party
! style="background-color:#E9E9E9;text-align:right;" |Votes
! style="background-color:#E9E9E9;text-align:right;" |%
|-
|style="background-color: "|
|align=left|Grigory Senin (incumbent)
|align=left|Communist Party
|46,516
|22,32%
|-
|style="background-color:#FCCA19"|
|align=left|Nina Konovalova
|align=left|Congress of Russian Communities-Yuri Boldyrev Movement
|44,244
|21.23%
|-
|style="background-color: " |
|align=left|Aleksandr Dorofeyev
|align=left|Independent
|37,926
|18.19%
|-
|style="background-color:"|
|align=left|Adam Bogus
|align=left|Yabloko
|33,735
|16.18%
|-
|style="background-color: " |
|align=left|Yevgeny Salov
|align=left|Independent
|11,319
|5.43%
|-
|style="background-color: " |
|align=left|Valentin Lednev
|align=left|Liberal Democratic Party
|7,285
|3.49%
|-
|style="background-color: " |
|align=left|Aslanby Sovmiz
|align=left|Independent
|4,805
|2.31%
|-
|style="background-color:"|
|align=left|Gennady Markov
|align=left|Our Home – Russia
|4,347
|2.09%
|-
|style="background-color: " |
|align=left|Vladimir Gavrilenko
|align=left|Independent
|3,162
|1.52%
|-
|style="background-color:#000000"|
|colspan=2 |against all
|9,548
|4.58%
|-
| colspan="5" style="background-color:#E9E9E9;"|
|- style="font-weight:bold"
| colspan="3" style="text-align:left;" | Total
| 208,443
| 100%
|-
| colspan="5" style="background-color:#E9E9E9;"|
|- style="font-weight:bold"
| colspan="4" |Source:
|
|}

2003

|-
! colspan=2 style="background-color:#E9E9E9;text-align:left;vertical-align:top;" |Candidate
! style="background-color:#E9E9E9;text-align:left;vertical-align:top;" |Party
! style="background-color:#E9E9E9;text-align:right;" |Votes
! style="background-color:#E9E9E9;text-align:right;" |%
|-
|style="background-color: "|
|align=left|Nikolay Demchuk
|align=left|United Russia
|87,050
|47.43%
|-
|style="background-color: " |
|align=left|Nina Konovalova
|align=left|Independent
|26,195
|14.27%
|-
|style="background-color: "|
|align=left|Grigory Senin (incumbent)
|align=left|Communist Party
|20,444
|11.14%
|-
|style="background-color: " |
|align=left|Timur Kalakutok
|align=left|Independent
|6,125
|3.34%
|-
|style="background-color: " |
|align=left|Sergey Grozov
|align=left|Independent
|5,907
|3.21%
|-
|style="background-color: " |
|align=left|Igor Andreyev
|align=left|Liberal Democratic Party
|4,027
|2.19%
|-
|style="background-color:#7C73CC"|
|align=left|Azmet Dzharimok
|align=left|Great Russia–Eurasian Union
|3,864
|2.11%
|-
|style="background-color:#00A1FF"|
|align=left|Anatoly Ivanov
|align=left|Party of Russia's Rebirth-Russian Party of Life
|3,166
|1.72%
|-
|style="background-color: " |
|align=left|Aleksandr Sirchenko
|align=left|Independent
|2,990
|1.63%
|-
|style="background-color:#11007D"|
|align=left|Aliy Khachak
|align=left|Unity
|2,371
|1.29%
|-
|style="background-color:#1042A5"|
|align=left|Nina Filipyeva
|align=left|Union of Right Forces
|2,156
|1.17%
|-
|style="background-color: " |
|align=left|Sergey Kupin
|align=left|Independent
|1,540
|0.84%
|-
|style="background-color:#DD137B"|
|align=left|Pavel Vasiliadi
|align=left|Social Democratic Party
|1,371
|0.75%
|-
|style="background-color:#000000"|
|colspan=2 |against all
|13,270
|7.23%
|-
| colspan="5" style="background-color:#E9E9E9;"|
|- style="font-weight:bold"
| colspan="3" style="text-align:left;" | Total
| 183,549
| 100%
|-
| colspan="5" style="background-color:#E9E9E9;"|
|- style="font-weight:bold"
| colspan="4" |Source:
|
|}

2016

|-
! colspan=2 style="background-color:#E9E9E9;text-align:left;vertical-align:top;" |Candidate
! style="background-color:#E9E9E9;text-align:left;vertical-align:top;" |Party
! style="background-color:#E9E9E9;text-align:right;" |Votes
! style="background-color:#E9E9E9;text-align:right;" |%
|-
|style="background-color: " |
|align=left|Vladislav Reznik
|align=left|Independent
|100,651
|55.22%
|-
|style="background-color: " |
|align=left|Yevgeny Salov
|align=left|Communist Party
|26,603
|14.59%
|-
|style="background-color: " |
|align=left|Nina Konovalova
|align=left|Rodina
|12,956
|7.11%
|-
|style="background-color: " |
|align=left|Denis Ogiyenko
|align=left|Liberal Democratic Party
|11,655
|6.39%
|-
|style="background-color: " |
|align=left|Alexander Loboda
|align=left|A Just Russia
|10,612
|5.82%
|-
|style="background-color: " |
|align=left|Sergey Gukasyan
|align=left|Communists of Russia
|7,016
|3.85%
|-
|style="background-color: " |
|align=left|Valery Brunikh
|align=left|Greens
|5,817
|3.19%
|-
| colspan="5" style="background-color:#E9E9E9;"|
|- style="font-weight:bold"
| colspan="3" style="text-align:left;" | Total
| 175,310
| 100%
|-
| colspan="5" style="background-color:#E9E9E9;"|
|- style="font-weight:bold"
| colspan="4" |Source:
|
|}

2021

|-
! colspan=2 style="background-color:#E9E9E9;text-align:left;vertical-align:top;" |Candidate
! style="background-color:#E9E9E9;text-align:left;vertical-align:top;" |Party
! style="background-color:#E9E9E9;text-align:right;" |Votes
! style="background-color:#E9E9E9;text-align:right;" |%
|-
|style="background-color: " |
|align=left|Vladislav Reznik (incumbent)
|align=left|Independent
|150,217
|64.81%
|-
|style="background-color: " |
|align=left|Yevgeny Salov
|align=left|Communist Party
|29,366
|12.67%
|-
|style="background-color: " |
|align=left|Andrey Mikhaylov
|align=left|A Just Russia — For Truth
|14,349
|6.19%
|-
|style="background-color: " |
|align=left|Yevgeny Grunin
|align=left|Liberal Democratic Party
|12,356
|5.33%
|-
|style="background-color: " |
|align=left|Sergey Gukasyan
|align=left|Communists of Russia
|10,468
|4.52%
|-
|style="background-color: "|
|align=left|Ruslanbek Tsikunib
|align=left|New People
|10,109
|4.36%
|-
| colspan="5" style="background-color:#E9E9E9;"|
|- style="font-weight:bold"
| colspan="3" style="text-align:left;" | Total
| 212,733
| 100%
|-
| colspan="5" style="background-color:#E9E9E9;"|
|- style="font-weight:bold"
| colspan="4" |Source:
|
|}

Sources
1. Адыгейский одномандатный избирательный округ

References

Russian legislative constituencies
Politics of the Republic of Adygea